Mission and Spacecraft Library (MSL) is a reference web site, maintained by NASA, containing information about satellites. It contains a catalog of several hundreds of satellites from different countries. The site was founded by Jet Propulsion Laboratory employee Mike Evans, who had a vision of building a database that would be publicly accessible via the World Wide Web. The site has not been updated since 1999.

External links 
Mission and Spacecraft Library

American educational websites
Online databases
Government databases in the United States
NASA online
Spaceflight